The Okee Dokee Brothers are an independent American bluegrass and American roots children's music duo from Minneapolis. Their 2012 CD/DVD release Can You Canoe?, with music and videos created during a 2011 paddle down the Mississippi River, won a Grammy for Best Children's Album in the 55th Grammy Awards. They released their second CD/DVD called Through the Woods in May 2014, with music and videos created during a 2013 trek up the Appalachian Trail. The album garnered a Grammy nomination in 2014. They traveled through the Southwest for another album and DVD, Saddle Up, which was also nominated for a Grammy in the best children's album category. Joe and Justin also published two picture books under Sterling Publishing (Sterling Children's) titled Can You Canoe? And Other Adventure Songs and Thousand Star Hotel. Their primary branding artist, Brandon Reese, illustrated the books.

In October 2018, The Okee Dokee Brothers released Winterland, an exuberant yet introspective collection of 16 original songs exploring the wonders and beauty of winter. A voyage from autumn to spring, Winterland presents secular winter music the entire family can enjoy while cozying up around the fire. This album also received a Grammy nomination in November 2019.

Most recently, in May 2020, they released, Songs for Singin, a 2-disc 27-song album full of inclusive songs so fans can join in and belt out. In the spirit of American folk legends, Woody Guthrie and Pete Seeger, Songs for Singin presents timeless messages of hope and unity. The album includes an illustrated 32-page book with the lyrics and chords to every song to inspire living room sing-alongs.

History 

Bandmates and childhood best friends, Joe Mailander and Justin Lansing, grew up in Denver and toured the midwest with their bluegrass band before settling in Minneapolis and starting their family music band, The Okee Dokee Brothers.

In 2011, Joe and Justin began a canoe trip at the headwaters of the Mississippi River, and ended at the St. Louis Gateway Arch. During their month-long journey on the Mississippi, they camped, canoed, filmed and composed the songs that make up their album Can You Canoe? This CD-DVD is the first release in their Adventure Album Series. Produced by Dean Jones in his Rosendale, NY, straw-bale studio, the record highlights guest appearances from Garth Hudson of The Band, Elizabeth Mitchell of You Are My Flower as well as Morgan Taylor and Rachel Loshak of Gustafer Yellowgold. The album received praise from NPR, won a Parents' Choice Award, and USA Today called it their "...favorite album of 2012".  Can You Canoe? also won the Grammy Award for Best Children's Album of the Year in early 2013.

In 2013, The Okee Dokee Brothers embarked on their second adventure, a month-long trek on the Appalachian Trail.  They hiked, camped, met mountain musicians, and wrote the songs that make up their second CD/DVD in their Adventure Album Series, entitled Through the Woods.  Also produced by Dean Jones, this album emulates the instruments and styles heard in traditional old-time Appalachian music. The record features Hubby Jenkins of the Carolina Chocolate Drops, 4-time Grammy winner David Holt, and 2-time Grammy winners Cathy Fink and Marcy Marxer. Through the Woods was nominated for a Grammy Award for Best Children's Album of the Year in early 2015.

In June 2015, The Okee Dokee Brothers went out West for a month-long horsepacking trip along the Continental Divide. They rode horses, camped out, told stories, and wrote songs. Saddle Up covers tales of western wildlife, Navajo stories, Southwest-style Spanglish, the issue of guns in western lore, friendship, and more. In 2016, "Saddle Up" was nominated for a Grammy in the best children's album category.

They celebrate the spirit of the winter season on their full-length studio album, Winterland (October 2018). It's an exuberant yet introspective collection of 16 original songs exploring the wonders and beauty of winter. A voyage from autumn to spring, Winterland presents secular winter music the entire family can enjoy while cozying up around the fire. The Okee Dokee Brothers released five winter music videos to accompany the music.

Songs for Singin: Stepping away from their outdoor adventure-themed albums (Can You Canoe?, Through the Woods, Saddle Up, and Winterland), The Okee Dokee Brothers engage their fans through meaningful social conversations in the form of call and response tunes, sea shanties, church hymns, campfire songs, all-ages social songs, and protest songs. Songs for Singin''' invites family members to strengthen their bonds by experiencing music together amidst the backdrop of an increasingly divided world. To capture the free-spirit and imperfections of sing-alongs, the recordings feature an array of tunes tracked live with choruses sung by kids and parents alike.

The band tours nationally, performing at such venues as Austin City Limits, Lincoln Center, The Getty Museum, National Geographic Live, Orchestra Hall with the Minnesota Orchestra, Winnipeg Folk Festival, and Wolf Trap National Park for the Performing Arts, among many other performing art centers and theaters.

On August 20, 2013, Minnesota Governor Mark Dayton proclaimed "Okee Dokee Brothers Day" in the State of Minnesota.

 Discography 
{| class="wikitable plainrowheaders" style="text-align:center;"
|+ List of albums, with selected chart positions, sales and certifications
! scope="col" rowspan="2" style="width:11em;"| Title
! scope="col" rowspan="2" style="width:19em;"| Album details
! scope="col" colspan="4"| Peak positions
|-
! scope="col" style="width:2.5em;font-size:90%;"| USFolk
! scope="col" style="width:2.5em;font-size:90%;"| USKids
! scope="col" style="width:2.5em;font-size:90%;"| USHeat.
! scope="col" style="width:2.5em;font-size:90%;"| USInd.
|-
! scope="row"| Kids With Beards|
 Released: September 2008
 Format: CD, Out of Print
| — || — || — || —
|-
! scope="row"| Take It Outside|
 Released: August 2010
 Format: CD, Out of Print
| — || — || — || —
|-
! scope="row"| ¡Excelente Fabuloso!|
 Released: October 2010
 Format: CD, Out of Print
| — || — || — || —
|-
! scope="row"| Can You Canoe? 
|
 Released: May 2012
 Format: CD+DVD
| — || — || — || —
|-
! scope="row"| Through The Woods 
|
 Released: May 2014
 Format: CD+DVD
| — || 25 || — || —
|-
! scope="row"| Saddle Up|
 Released: May 2016
 Format: CD+DVD
| 17 || 5 || 18 || —
|-
! scope="row"| Winterland|
 Released: October 2018
 Format: CD
| — || 4 || 15 || 46
|-
! scope="row"| Songs for Singin'|
 Released: May 2020
 Format: CD/Songbook
| — || - || - || -
|}

 Video productions 
Each Okee Dokee Brother Adventure Album has an accompanying film that documents Joe and Justin's songwriting trip. These movies tell the story of The Okee Dokee Brothers' travels while including educational segments, camping shenanigans, music videos, interviews with locals, pristine nature scenes, and comprehensive tomfoolery. All the horseback riding, hiking, canoeing, camping, and songwriting footage is filmed on location in the setting of each adventure's theme (The Mississippi River, The Appalachian Trail, and the Great American West). The footage is filmed by Alex Johnson, and Jed Anderson (percussionist for the band) directs and edits the films (JedEditedIt Productions and InTents Studios). The films can be purchased on iTunes and Amazon, seen on the DVDs that come with their CDs, and can be found on YouTube.

The Okee Dokee Brothers released five winter music videos to accompany their album, Winterland, and continue to release music videos for songs on each of their following albums.

 Picture books 
Joe and Justin are working with Sterling Publishing (Sterling Children's) to publish two picture books that come with CDs of their songs.

In March 2017, they released a new picture book, Thousand Star Hotel, with Sterling  Publishing. Inspired by the folktale "The Fisherman and His Wife," The Okee Dokee Brothers have "created a fanciful story about the things we wish for... and the things we really need." The accompanying CD features 11 nighttime songs and a fully dramatized audiobook of the story, read by The Okee Dokee Brothers.

Their first book, titled Can You Canoe? And Other Adventure Songs'', was illustrated by Brandon Reese. The book "invites you to journey cross-country with The Okee Dokee Brothers through twelve of their irresistible, boot-stompin' tunes. You'll encounter hungry black bears and tall-tale spinners; quiet canoes and cozy camping tents; a jumpin' jamboree and a bullfrog opera. As you listen to the songs and follow along with the illustrated lyrics in this collection, you might even be inspired to head out on some outdoor adventures of your own!"

Band members 
 Justin Lansing – banjo and lead vocals
 Joe Mailander – acoustic guitar and lead vocals

Additional and touring band members 
 Jed Anderson – percussion and backup vocals
 Liz Draper – stand-up bass
 Jillian Rae – fiddle and backup vocals
 Andy Lambert – clogger
 Carlos Medina – accordion

Notes

References

External links 
 Official website
 Youtube.com
 NPR Music Review: 'Can You Canoe'
 Grammy-Nominated Okee Dokee Brothers: Bluegrass Band Makes Music For Kids And Adults

American children's musical groups
American bluegrass music groups
American folk musical groups
American musical duos
Folk music duos
Musical groups from Minnesota
Mississippi River